Receptor-interacting serine/threonine-protein kinase 2 is an enzyme that in humans is encoded by the RIPK2 gene.

This gene encodes a member of the receptor-interacting protein (RIP) family of serine/threonine protein kinases. The encoded protein contains a C-terminal caspase recruitment domain (CARD), and is a component of signaling complexes in both the innate and adaptive immune pathways. It is a potent activator of NF-κB and inducer of apoptosis in response to various stimuli.

Interactions
RIPK2 has been shown to interact with BIRC2.

References

Further reading